Ctenochares bicolorus, the black-tipped orange ichneumon is a wasp in the family Ichneumonidae. Originally from Africa, this species has spread and is considered invasive in many other parts of the world. It is a pupal parasitoid of Chrysodeixis chalcites.

References

Ichneumonidae
Insects of Africa
Insects described in 1767